Simon (Sim) Gokkes (21 March 1897, Amsterdam – 5 February 1943, Auschwitz) was a Dutch-Jewish composer.

Biography
As a child, Gokkes took his first singing lessons with Ben Geysel, an opera singer who ran the Rembrandt Theatre of Amsterdam. Gokkes was also a pupil of Victor Schlesinger, cantor of the Rapenburg Synagogue in Amsterdam.  In 1912, Gokkes wrote his first compositions, "Ngolinu Leshabiag" and "Yigdal".  He studied composition with Sem Dresden and also piano and flute at the Conservatorium van Amsterdam, finishing in 1919.  He then worked as an assistant director of the Netherlands Opera.

Throughout his life, Gokkes directed several choirs.  In 1921, he founded the School Choir of Amsterdam.  For years he was director of the Santo Serviçio, the choir of the Portuguese Synagogue in Amsterdam.  Gokkes is known as an innovator of synagogue music.  His compositions relate primarily to religious themes.

In 1923, Gokkes married pianist Rebecca Winnik.  Along with his wife and his two children, David and Rachel, he was murdered in Auschwitz concentration camp on 5 February 1943.

Only some of his works are preserved in the Netherlands Music Institute.

Works preserved at the Netherlands Music Institute
 Le pèlerin de Jérusalem, Amsterdam, May 1928, lyrics by Jacob Israël de Haan, for voice and piano
 Kaddisch, Amsterdam, June 1928, for voice and piano
 C’en est fait, June 1928, lyrics by Ernest Bussy, for voice and piano
 Kermesse d’été, Amsterdam, May 1928, lyrics by Willem de Mérode, for voice and piano
 Duiven, Amsterdam, May 1928, lyrics by François Pauwels
 La lune blanche luit dans les bois, Amsterdam, June 1928, lyrics by Paul Verlaine, for voice and piano
 Trois Lieder hébreux, Amsterdam, 1926, lyrics by Jehuda-ben Samuel Hallevi, for voice and piano
 Kaddisch, Amsterdam, June 1928, for voice and piano
 Sonatine, June 1939, for piano
 Kinah, Amsterdam, April 1928, Lamentations of Jeremiah, Chapter I, Verses 1-8, for solo voices, wind quintet and piano

1897 births
1943 deaths
Dutch male classical composers
Dutch classical composers
Dutch conductors (music)
Male conductors (music)
Modernist composers
Dutch people who died in Auschwitz concentration camp
Musicians from Amsterdam
Dutch Jews who died in the Holocaust
Jewish composers
Conservatorium van Amsterdam alumni
20th-century conductors (music)
20th-century Dutch male musicians